Petros Karavitis (born 11 March 1952) is a Greek former professional footballer who played as a midfielder.

Club career
Karavitis began his football career at his hometown club, Chaidari. He transferred to the youth team of Olympiacos for a fee of 30,000 drachmas in 1968. In December 1970, manager Lakis Petropoulos promoted Karavitis to the first team, in which he remained a regular in several roles for ten years. He won four Greek Championships and three Greek Cups with Olympiacos, including two domestic doubles in 1973 and 1975. In December 1980, Karavitis left the club after the then president, Stavros Daifas did not proceed in renewing his contract.

Thus, Karavitis signed for AEK Athens. During his one-and-a-half-year spell at AEK, Karavitis was used as a regular. On 25 April 1982, in AEK's away match against Panserraikos, he was sent off alongside Mojaš Radonjić for insulting the referee. As a result, he was punished with a 19-match ban, which combined with his age, led to his departure from the club. In summer 1982, Karavitis signed for Proodeftiki, where he played for two seasons. In 1984, Karavitis returned to Chaidari as a player-manager, and finished his playing career in 1986.

International career
Karavitis was a member of Greece U21, which in 1971 won the Balkan Youth Championship.

Karavitis played a total of 10 appearances with Greece, scoring three goals, from 1975 to 1979. His debut took place on 30 December 1975, under Alketas Panagoulias in an away friendly 3–2 loss against Italy,  where he played for 46 minutes before being replaced by Georgios Delikaris.

After football
After the end of his career, Karavitis was involved in coaching, but remaining in low categories, while he was also involved in politics as a candidate in Athens B with the party of LAOS and later at the District level, with the combination of Giorgos Patoulis. He was also involved in the administration of Chaidari as the head of a group of investors.

Honours

Olympiacos
Alpha Ethniki: 1972–73, 1973–74, 1974–75, 1979–80
Greek Cup: 1970–71, 1972–73, 1974–75

Greece U21
Balkan Youth Championship: 1971

References

External links

1952 births
Living people
Association football midfielders
Greece international footballers
Olympiacos F.C. players
AEK Athens F.C. players
Proodeftiki F.C. players
Chaidari F.C. players
Super League Greece players
Footballers from Athens
Greek footballers